Wallwork is a surname. Notable people with the surname include:

Elizabeth Wallwork (1883–1969), English born, New Zealand painter
James Wallwork (born 1930), American politician
Jenny Wallwork (born 1987), English badminton player
Jim Wallwork (1919–2013), British World War II pilot
John Wallwork (aviator) (1898–1922), English World War I flying ace
John Wallwark (born 1946), English surgeon
Ron Wallwork (born 1941), English racewalker
Ronnie Wallwork (born 1977), English footballer